This is a list of notable events in country music that took place in the year 1931.

Events 

Jimmie Rodgers, "the Father of Country Music", continued to dominate Hillbilly (Country) music in 1931, though the Great Depression was causing record sales and royalties to spiral downward at a frightening rate (by 1934, Columbia Records would be bankrupt). Only the Carter Family would come close. The top-selling records are listed below.

Top Hillbilly (Country) Recordings 1931

Thanks to the "Discography of American Historical Recordings" website, the year 1931 is perhaps the most accurate top Hillbilly records list of all. Eighteen of the songs were ranked from sales numbers recorded by Victor records, (as "Number sold," under "Other information") derive from markings on the backs of blue history cards and are included in DAHR, when known, as part of our effort to make available significant data found in original Victor documents. As John Bolig points out in the introduction to his Victor black label discography : 1800-1900 series (Denver: Mainspring Press, 2008), these numbers are not to be considered authoritative. It is likely that they represent a sales audit from a specific time; they do not appear to have been updated regularly. In addition, it is possible that the sales figures may represent cumulative sales from various issues (catalog numbers) of the masters represented on the blue history cards, and not exclusively from one such release. 

Many things are possible, but based on experience, even The Billboard surveys did not approach reasonable accuracy until the late 1940s, due to small sample size, confusion with best-selling, jukebox, and airplay charts, and any number of startup issues. At this point in history, Victor made up a large percentage of Hillbilly releases because of economic circumstances. It appears looking back they kept the best records by far of any of the labels.

Remember, numerical rankings are approximate, there were no Billboard charts in 1931, the numbers are only used for a frame of reference.

Births 
 July 26 – Fred Foster, record producer and songwriter (died 2019).
 September 12 – George Jones, "The Possum," one of the genre's all-time greatest vocalists (died 2013).
 November 8 – Harold Shedd, record producer most associated with the 1980s success of Alabama.
 December 30 – Skeeter Davis, the top vocalist in country music during the 1960s, best known for the hit song "The End of the World" (died 2004).

Deaths 
 May 21 – Charlie Poole, banjo player and leader of The North Carolina Ramblers (heart attack)

Further reading 
 Kingsbury, Paul, "Vinyl Hayride: Country Music Album Covers 1947–1989," Country Music Foundation, 2003
 Millard, Bob, "Country Music: 70 Years of America's Favorite Music," HarperCollins, New York, 1993
 Whitburn, Joel. "Top Country Songs 1944–2005 – 6th Edition." 2005.

References

Country
Country music by year